In mathematical analysis, the Whitney covering lemma, or Whitney decomposition, asserts the existence of a certain type of partition of an open set in a Euclidean space.  Originally it was employed in the proof of Hassler Whitney's extension theorem.  The lemma was subsequently applied to prove generalizations of the Calderón–Zygmund decomposition.

Roughly speaking, the lemma states that it is possible to decompose an open set by cubes each of whose diameters is proportional, within certain bounds, to its distance from the boundary of the open set.  More precisely:

Whitney Covering Lemma 

Then there exists a family of closed cubes  such that

  and the 's have disjoint interiors.
 
 If the boundaries of two cubes  and  touch then 
 For a given  there exist at most 's that touch it.

Where  denotes the length of a cube .

References

 
 .
 .
 .

Covering lemmas